Muldersdrift, in the Gauteng Province of South Africa, is a picturesque rural area situated 27 km north-west of the CBD of Johannesburg, between Johannesburg and the Magaliesberg mountain range. The area falls under the West Rand District Municipality, and is part of Mogale City. 

Located in the Kromdraai Valley and on the Crocodile River, Muldersdrift forms part of the Crocodile Ramble, a scenic tourist route generally regarded as the most popular of all the craft routes around South Africa.  Muldersdrift is the gateway to the West Rand, and forms part of Cradle of Humankind World Heritage Site.

History
Muldersdrift is found on a drift, a ford offering a safe crossing point of the Crocodile River. The river crossing point was on an old wagon route that lead from Pretoria in the north-east to Potchefstroom in the south-west. The area was said to have been settled in 1840s as farmland and the area acquired its name in 1866 after the Mulder family when they camped close to the river when they were unable to across the drift due to flooding. The spot would soon become an outspan (resting spot) site for horse and oxen on the wagon route and would attract a postmaster long before the discovery of gold on the Witwatersrand.

Places of interest
With its wealth of tourism establishments and more than 40 wedding venues and conference centres, Muldersdrift is known for its fine accommodation, restaurants, spas and health resorts. It is often referred to as the “wedding capital” of Gauteng.
Home to numerous small farms, smallholdings and nurseries, the area has acquired a reputation for being an arts and cultural hub with a number of home craft industries with a number of potters, artists, brewers, and astronomers based in the area.

The Wonder Cave near Muldersdrift is one of the show caves of the Cradle of Humankind World Heritage Site.  It is the third largest cave in South Africa and one of the world’s richest hominid fossil sites.

Muldersdrift is also home to Gilroy’s Brewery.

Situated in Muldersdrift is Gauteng’s newest casino.  The Silverstar Casino and Entertainment Centre contains a variety of restaurants, retail shops, conference facilities, a spa, and a 34-room hotel.

Opened in October 2013, the  Cradlestone Mall is named after its proximity to the Cradle of Humankind.

See also
Walter Sisulu National Botanical Garden 
Cradle of Humankind
Lanseria International Airport
Magaliesburg
Hartbeespoort Dam
Maropeng
 Sterkfontein Caves
Wonder Cave
Krugersdorp Game Reserve
Lesedi Cultural Village

References

External links
Gauteng Tourism - Muldersdrift
 Valley of Ancestors Cradle of Humankind World Heritage Site
Cradlestone Mall
Silverstar Casino
Leafy Greens

Populated places in the Mogale City Local Municipality
Tourist attractions in Gauteng